Clatt (Gaelic cleithe, 'concealed'), is a village in Aberdeenshire, Scotland. The remains of a morthouse are located in the cemetery of the old church.

Its schools are Clatt Primary School and The Gordon Schools, Huntly.

Clatt Primary School
Clatt Primary School is a primary school in the village of Clatt, Aberdeenshire, Scotland.It is around 10 miles from Huntly. It is a small school with one teacher. It is a feeder school for The Gordon Schools, Huntly.

References

Villages in Aberdeenshire